Marcel Jacques Amand Romain Boulenger (Paris, 9 September 1873 – Chantilly, Oise, 21 May 1932) was a French novelist and fiction writer. He was awarded the Prix Nee of the Académie Française in 1918 and the Prix Stendhal in 1919. He was also a fencer of international standard, competing in the late 19th century and early 20th centuries.

Writings
As an author he is primarily known for his pastiches and his many faux "autobiographies" of imaginary persons, for example the Souvenirs du marquis de Floranges (1811-1834) (1923), and Le Duc de Morny, prince franc̦ais (1925).

Olympics
He competed in the fencing at the 1900 Summer Olympics in Paris and won the bronze medal in the foil, being defeated by fellow French fencer Henri Masson in the semi-final. Twelve years later he participated in the art competition at the Summer Olympics in Stockholm.

Family
He was the brother of the journalist Jacques Boulenger.

References

External links

Wikisource: Marcel Boulenger, Au Pays de Sylvie

1873 births
1932 deaths
Fencers from Paris
French male foil fencers
Olympic bronze medalists for France
Olympic fencers of France
Fencers at the 1900 Summer Olympics
Olympic medalists in fencing
20th-century French non-fiction writers
20th-century French male writers
Medalists at the 1900 Summer Olympics
Olympic competitors in art competitions
20th-century French people